This is a list of airports in Papua New Guinea, sorted by location.

Papua New Guinea, officially the Independent State of Papua New Guinea, is a country in Oceania, occupying the eastern half of the island of New Guinea and numerous offshore islands (the western portion of the island is a part of the Indonesian provinces of Papua and West Papua). It is located in the southwestern Pacific Ocean, in a region defined since the early 19th century as Melanesia. The capital is Port Moresby.

The country has 22 province-level divisions: 20 provinces, one autonomous region (Bougainville) and the National Capital District. Each province has one or more districts, and each district has one or more local level government (LLG) areas.



Airports 

Airport names shown in bold indicate the airport has scheduled service on commercial airlines.

See also 

 Air Niugini destinations
 Airlines PNG#Destinations
 Boridi
 Transport in Papua New Guinea
 List of airports by ICAO code: A#AY - Papua New Guinea
 Wikipedia:WikiProject Aviation/Airline destination lists: Oceania#Papua New Guinea
 List of the busiest airports in Oceania

References 
 
  – includes IATA codes
 Great Circle Mapper: Airports in Papua New Guinea – IATA and ICAO codes
 World Aero Data: Airports in Papua New Guinea – ICAO codes
 PNG Airstrip Guide – coordinates
 

Papua New Guinea
 
Airports
Airports
Papua New Guinea